The de Havilland DH.29 Doncaster was a British long-range high-wing monoplane of the 1920s built by de Havilland.

History
The DH.29 Doncaster was ordered by the British Air Ministry as an experimental long-range monoplane. The aircraft was a high-wing cantilever monoplane with unswept wings of wooden structure with a fabric covering. It had a box section wooden fuselage with a single fin. The crew of two sat in an open cockpit ahead of the wing. Two aircraft were built between 1920 and 1921 at Stag Lane Aerodrome. Early testing of the first aircraft (Serial J6849) resulted in a redesign of the engine installation. The second aircraft (Registered G-EAYO) was built as a ten-seat commercial aircraft. The airlines were not interested and further development was abandoned, effort being put into the biplane de Havilland DH.34. A proposed military reconnaissance version, the DH.30, was never built. The two aircraft finished their life at RAF Martlesham Heath with tests and trials, particularly on the thick-section cantilever wings. The Doncaster was the first British aircraft to use such wings.

Operators

 Air Ministry

Specifications (military version)

See also

References

Citations

Bibliography
 
 
 

High-wing aircraft
Single-engined tractor aircraft
1920s British airliners
1920s British experimental aircraft
Doncaster
Aircraft first flown in 1921
Conventional landing gear